Perintown is an unincorporated community in Clermont County, in the U.S. state of Ohio.

History
A variant name was Perin's Mills. The community was named for Samuel Perin, who started a watermill at the site in 1813. A post office called Perins Mills was established in 1830, the name was changed to Perintown in 1890, and the post office closed in 1984.

References

Unincorporated communities in Clermont County, Ohio
Unincorporated communities in Ohio